The Hampden Football Netball League is an Australian rules football and netball league based in South-Western Victoria, with clubs located in towns along or near the Princes Highway from Camperdown to Portland.

The league is a major country league. It comprises an amalgamation of the Hampden Football League with the women's netball league with the same teams and playing draw.

History
The Hampden Football League was formed in 1930, when the four founding clubs broke away from the Western District FL.
Terang and Camperdown did not want to continue to travel to Hamilton because their players were farmers who could not spend all day away from
the farm to play football, as they had cows to milk. 

Colac and Coragulac merged to form Colac-Coragulac in 1980.  In 1986 they dropped Coragulac from the club's name, then in 2001 Colac left the Hampden league to join the Geelong FL.

North Warrnambool were admitted to the league in the 1997 season.

In 1999, Mortlake and Derrinallum merged to form the Western Lions, however the club was not successful and folded during the 2000 season.  Mortlake then attempted a new merger with Terang, which has proven successful and continues to the current day, with matches played in both towns.

In 2013 teams from regional centres Hamilton and Portland will compete.

The year 2020 saw the senior football and netball season cancelled as a consequence of the COVID-19 pandemic.

Timeline

Clubs

Current

Former

Win/loss record

Maskell Medalists

Historical Ladders

1930 Ladder 

 1st Semi Final  Terang 15.11.101 Defeated Mortlake 9.11.65
2nd Semi Final  Cobden 15.9.99 Defeated Camperdown 8.19.67
Grand Final Cobden	13.9.87 Defeated Terang 6.30.66

1931 Ladder 

 1st Semi Final  Camperdown 8.17.65 Defeated Terang 5.7.37
2nd Semi Final  Mortlake 11.15.81 Defeated Cobden 8.17.65
Preliminary Final  Mortlake11.17.83 Defeated Camperdown 7.8.50
Grand Final Mortlake 15.12.102 Defeated Cobden 9.10.64

1932 Ladder 

 1st Semi Final  Mortlake 10.9.69 Defeated Camperdown 8.11.59
2nd Semi Final  Terang 13.12.90 Defeated Cobden 11.11.77 
Preliminary Final  Cobden 7.23 65 Drew with Mortlake 9.11.65
Preliminary Final Replay Cobden 12.17.89 Defeated  Mortlake 10.11.71
Grand Final Terang 15.18.108 Defeated Cobden 13.9.87

1933 Ladder 

 1st Semi Final  South Warrnambool 9.19.73 Defeated Warrnambool 10.5.65
2nd Semi Final   Cobden 19.13.127 Defeated Mortlake 2.14.26
Preliminary Final  South Warrnambool 13.7.85 Defeated  Mortlake 10.11.71
Grand Final  Cobden 6.13.49 Defeated  South Warrnambool 6.6.42

1934 Ladder 

 1st Semi Final  Terang 16.13.109 Defeated Cobden 9.17.71
2nd Semi Final   Mortlake 12.13.85 Defeated South Warrnambool 12.12.84
Preliminary Final  South Warrnambool 7.21.63 Drew with Terang 8.15.63
Preliminary Final Replay Terang 14.13.97 Defeated South Warrnambool 9.14.68
Grand Final  Terang 11.15.81 Defeated  Mortlake 10.19.79

1935 Ladder 

 1st Semi Final   Terang 15.6.96 Defeated South Warrnambool 11.15.81 
2nd Semi Final   Mortlake 9.10.64 Defeated Warrnambool 4.12.36
Preliminary Final   Warrnambool 10.15.75 Defeated Terang 9.14.68
Grand Final   Warrnambool 14.16.100 Defeated Mortlake 10.19.79

1936 Ladder 

 Elimination Final   South Warrnambool 13.11.89 Defeated Cobden 7.7.49
 1st Semi Final   Terang 24.21.165 Defeated South Warrnambool 11.14.80
2nd Semi Final   Mortlake 15.17.107 Defeated Warrnambool 14.5.89
Preliminary Final   Warrnambool 10.19.79 Defeated  Terang 10.9.69
Grand Final   Mortlake 12.15.87 Defeated  Warrnambool 11.16.82

1937 Ladder 

 Elimination Final   Terang 12.18.90 Defeated  South Warrnambool 11.10.76
 1st Semi Final   Terang 11.13.79 Defeated Mortlake 8.13.61
2nd Semi Final   Warrnambool 13.13.91 Defeated Camperdown 11.12.78
Preliminary Final   Camperdown 11.9.75 Defeated  Terang 7.14.56
Grand Final   Warrnambool 12.14.86 Defeated  Camperdown 9.17.71

1938 Ladder 

 1st Semi Final  Warrnambool 17.16.118 Defeated Terang 16.15.111
2nd Semi Final  Camperdown 7.14.56 Defeated South Warrnambool 8.5.53
Preliminary Final  Warrnambool 16.16.112 Defeated  South Warrnambool 7.11.53
Grand Final  Camperdown 11.19.85 Defeated  Warrnambool 9.14.68

1939 Ladder 

 1st Semi Final  Cobden 16.19.115 Defeated Terang 7.12.54
2nd Semi Final  South Warrnambool 8.10.58 Defeated Warrnambool 8.7.55
Preliminary Final  Warrnambool 14.14.98 Defeated  Cobden 13.14.92
Grand Final  Warrnambool 14.19.103 Defeated  South Warrnambool 14.11.95

1940 Ladder 

 1st Semi Final  Camperdown 14.14.98 Defeated Terang 12.9.81
2nd Semi Final  South Warrnambool 14.9.93 Defeated Warrnambool 11.15.81
Preliminary Final  Warrnambool 17.18.120 Defeated  Camperdown 7.6.48
Grand Final  South Warrnambool 11.21.87 Defeated Warrnambool 10.7.67

1946 Ladder 

 1st Semi Final  Terang 10.10.70 Defeated  South Warrnambool 9.10.64
2nd Semi Final  Warrnambool 23.18.156 Defeated  Camperdown 11.11.77
Preliminary Final  Camperdown 15.10.100 Defeated  Terang 15.7.97
Grand Final  Warrnambool 14.14.98 Defeated  Camperdown 9.9.63

1947 Ladder 

 1st Semi Final  Cobden 11.24.90 Defeated  Terang 7.10.52
2nd Semi Final  Camperdown 7.8.50  Defeated  Warrnambool 6.12.48
Preliminary Final  Warrnambool 10.12.72 Defeated  Cobden 9.9.63
Grand Final  Warrnambool 18.17.125 Defeated  Camperdown 9.11.65

1948 Ladder 

 1st Semi Final  Camperdown 22.17.149 Defeated  Terang 9.19.73
2nd Semi Final  Cobden 18.18.126 Defeated  South Warrnambool 12.8.80
Preliminary Final  South Warrnambool 3.20.38 Defeated  Camperdown 3.13.31
Grand Final  Cobden 11.13.79 Defeated  South Warrnambool 10.6.66

1949 Ladder 

 1st Semi Final  Warrnambool 10.6.66 Defeated  South Warrnambool 4.6.30
2nd Semi Final  Cobden 10.19.79 Defeated  Colac 9.12.66
Preliminary Final  Colac 6.17.53 Defeated  Warrnambool 5.13.43
Grand Final  Cobden 11.13.79 Defeated  Colac 7.11.53

Premierships (Football)
Seniors

1930	Cobden	13	9	87	def	Terang	6	30	66
1931	Mortlake	15	12	102	def	Cobden	9	10	64
1932	Terang	15	18	108	def	Cobden	13	9	87
1933	Cobden	6	13	49	def	South Warrnambool	6	6	42
1934	Terang	11	15	81	def	Mortlake	10	19	79
1935	Warrnambool	14	16	100	def	Mortlake	10	19	79
1936	Mortlake	12	15	87	def	Warrnambool	11	16	82
1937	Warrnambool	12	14	86	def	Camperdown	9	17	71
1938	Camperdown	11	19	85	def	Warrnambool	9	14	68
1939	Warrnambool	14	19	103	def	South Warrnambool	14	11	95
1940	South Warrnambool	11	21	87	def	Warrnambool	10	7	67
1941	- 1945 No play due to World War 2																
1946	Warrnambool	14	14	98	def	Camperdown	9	9	63
1947	Warrnambool	18	17	125	def	Camperdown	9	11	65
1948	Cobden	11	13	79	def	South Warrnambool	10	6	66
1949	Cobden	11	13	79	def	Colac	7	11	53
1950	Colac	12	8	80	def	Warrnambool	10	17	77
1951	Camperdown	11	9	75	def	Cobden	6	8	44
1952	Colac	6	4	40	def	Warrnambool	4	9	33
1953	Colac	12	6	78	def	Cobden	10	12	72
1954	South Warrnambool	9	8	62	Defeated	Terang	5	8	38
1955	Terang	14	18	102	def	Colac	14	15	99
1956	Terang	14	13	97	def	Port Fairy	12	9	81
1957	Warrnambool	10	16	76	Defeated	Colac	8	8	56
1958	Port Fairy	6	16	52	def	Colac	6	14	50
1959	Warrnambool	19	15	129	def	Cobden	5	11	41
1960	Warrnambool	15	24	114	def	Camperdown	7	6	48
1961	Colac	14	14	98	def	Camperdown	5	5	35
1962	Warrnambool	10	8	68	def	Mortlake	8	12	60
1963	Warrnambool	9	9	63	def	Colac	5	8	38
1964	South Warrnambool	13	13	91	def	Colac	10	5	65
1965	Colac	8	11	59	def	Warrnambool	7	10	52
1966	Warrnambool	8	18	66	def	Mortlake	7	8	50
1967	Terang	12	5	77	def	Mortlake	8	8	56
1968	Camperdown	13	3	81	def	Terang	9	7	61
1969	South Warrnambool	12	17	89	def	Mortlake	12	16	88
1970	Camperdown	11	12	78	def	Mortlake	11	10	76
1971	Koroit	14	9	93	def	Port Fairy	11	7	73
1972	Terang	15	13	103	def	Port Fairy	8	13	61
1973	Koroit	10	7	67	def	Colac	7	10	52
1974	South Warrnambool	7	8	50	def	Camperdown	6	6	42
1975	Mortlake	11	13	79	def	Warrnambool	10	11	71

1976	Warrnambool	14	15	99	def	Terang	6	11	47
1977	Warrnambool	11	14	80	def	Terang	10	7	67
1978	Warrnambool	13	10	88	def	Terang	13	8	86
1979	Terang	13	11	89	def	Cobden	12	10	82
1980	Colac-Coragulac	19	14	128	def	Terang	9	12	66
1981	Terang	13	16	94	def	Colac-Coragulac	7	8	50
1982	Colac-Coragulac	14	10	94	def	Terang	12	10	82
1983	Colac-Coragulac	11	5	71	def	Port Fairy	9	6	60
1984	Warrnambool	9	15	69	def	Cobden	4	5	29
1985	Colac-Coragulac	22	14	146	def	South Warrnambool	14	6	90
1986	Warrnambool	19	9	123	def	Camperdown	10	10	70
1987	Warrnambool	14	12	96	def	Camperdown	12	10	82
1988	Warrnambool	12	10	82	def	South Warrnambool	10	15	75
1989	Warrnambool	21	14	140	def	South Warrnambool	11	11	77
1990	South Warrnambool	23	21	159	def	Colac	5	8	38
1991	South Warrnambool	2	6	18	def	Terang	1	6	12
1992	Warrnambool	20	12	132	def	South Warrnambool	13	12	90
1993	Colac	15	9	99	def	Terang	12	16	88
1994	South Warrnambool	19	15	129	def	Camperdown	12	15	87
1995	Terang	18	12	120	def	South Warrnambool	14	11	95
1996	South Warrnambool	18	7	115	def	Terang	14	9	93
1997	Cobden	28	10	178	def	Port Fairy	13	12	90
1998	Cobden	15	6	96	def	South Warrnambool	11	10	76
1999	Camperdown	20	9	129	def	Colac	12	11	83
2000	Camperdown	14	10	94	def	Koroit	7	9	51
2001	Warrnambool	15	4	94	def	Koroit	11	10	76
2002	Warrnambool	13	19	97	def	Terang	11	7	73
2003	Koroit	17	8	110	def	Camperdown	15	13	103
2004	Terang-Mortlake	18	5	113	def	Warrnambool	11	10	76
2005	Terang-Mortlake	12	11	83	def	Port Fairy	9	8	62
2006	South Warrnambool	17	15	117	def	Camperdown	13	8	86
2007	Koroit	15	13	103	def	Cobden	10	9	69
2008	Terang-Mortlake	9	14	68	def	Warrnambool	3	10	28
2009      Koroit          19      7       121      def        Warrnambool     11      16      82
2010      Warrnambool     8       13      61      def        South Warrnambool     5     14     44
2011      South Warrnambool     11     14     80     def       Warrnambool     5     9     39
2012      Warrnambool     15      13      103     def        Cobden          10      6       66
2013      Warrnambool     13      11        89     def        Koroit             6       16      52
2014      Koroit     15     9     99     def     Warrnambool     12     11     83
2015      Koroit     13     14     92     def     Warrnambool    7     9     51
2016      Koroit     15     10     100     def     North Warrnambool     10     7     67
2017      Koroit     8     8     56     def     Port Fairy     6     5     41
2018      Koroit     8     9     57     def     Camperdown    6     10     46

2009 Ladder

2010 Ladder

2011 Ladder

2012 Ladder

2013 Ladder

2014 Ladder

2015 Ladder

2016 Ladder

2017 Ladder

VFL/AFL players

Dick Harris - Warrnambool to Richmond
Thorold Merrett - Cobden to Collingwood
Alistair Lord - Cobden to Geelong
Stewart Lord - Cobden to Geelong
Peter Pianto - Coragulac to Geelong
Stephen Theodore - Coragulac to St.Kilda 
John Rantall - Cobden to South Melbourne
John Cassin - Colac to Essendon
Amon Buchanan - Colac to South Melbourne
Austin McCrabb - Colac to Geelong to Hawthorn
Kevin Neale - South Warrnambool to St.Kilda
John Northey - Mortlake to Richmond
Ronnie Wearmouth - Terang to Collingwood
Michael Turner - Warrnambool to Geelong
Paul Couch - Warrnambool to Geelong
Simon Hogan - Warrnambool to Geelong
Ross Thornton - Camperdown to Fitzroy
Noel Mugavin - Port Fairy to Fitzroy
Leon Harris - Mortlake to Fitzroy
Bernie Harris - Mortlake to Fitzroy, 
Ken Hinkley - Camperdown to Fitzroy then 
Paul Broderick - Camperdown to Fitzroy then Richmond
Charlie Payne - Terang to Essendon
Ian Payne - Terang to Essendon
Leon Cameron - South Warrnambool to Footscray to Richmond
 Kerrin Hayes- Port Fairy to Fitzroy

Adrian Gleeson - Koroit to Carlton
Wayne Schwass - South Warrnambool to North Melbourne to Sydney
Scott Lucas - Camperdown to Essendon
Jonathan Brown - South Warrnambool to Brisbane
Joe McLaren - Koroit to St.Kilda then North Melbourne
Gary Keane - Koroit to Fitzroy
Daniel O'Keefe - Warrnambool to Sydney
Luke Vogels -  Terang Mortlake to 
Gary Rohan - Cobden to Sydney
Ben Cunnington - Cobden to North Melbourne
Luke Rounds - Terang Mortlake to Collingwood
Jordie McKenzie - Terang to Melbourne
Billie Smedts - North Warrnambool to Geelong Falcons to Geelong
David Haynes - North Warrnambool to West Coast Eagles to Geelong
Jackson Merrett - Cobden to  Essendon
Martin Gleeson - Koroit to  Essendon
Zach Merrett - Cobden to  Essendon 
Kevin O'Keeffe - Terang to Fitzroy 
Daryl Salmon - Terang to Collingwood 
Lewis Taylor - Mortlake to Brisbane 
 Daryl Griffiths - Terang to 
 Brian McKenzie - Terang to Collingwood
 Hugh Worrall - Cobden to  
 Alan McConnell - Terang to Footscray

Bibliography 
 Evergreen Hampden: The Hampden Football League and its people, 1930-1976 by Fred Bond & Don Grossman, 1979 – 
 History of Football in the Western District by John Stoward – Aussie Footy Books, 2008 –

References

External links 
 SportsTG website
 Twitter page

Australian rules football competitions in Victoria (Australia)
Netball leagues in Victoria (Australia)
Hampden Football League
1930 establishments in Australia